As part of the British honours system, Special Honours are issued at the Monarch's pleasure at any given time. The Special Honours refer to the awards made within royal prerogative, operational honours and other honours awarded outside the New Years Honours and Birthday Honours.

Lord Lieutenant 
 John Rawcliffe Airey Crabtree,  - to be Lord-Lieutenant of and in the County of West Midlands. – 3 January 2017
 Chief Constable Julie Spence,  - to be Lord-Lieutenant of and in the County of Cambridgeshire. – 5 April 2017
 Lois Patricia Golding,  - to be Lord-Lieutenant of and in the County and City of Bristol. – 27 April 2017
 Jennifer Tolhurst, - to be Lord-Lieutenant of Essex. – 22 June 2017
 Robert Voss,  - to be Lord-Lieutenant of the County of Hertfordshire. – 4 August 2017
 The Rt. Hon. The Viscount Thurso,  - to be Lord Lieutenant of Caithness. – 17 August 2017
 Moira Niven,  - to be Lord Lieutenant of West Lothian – 17 August 2017
 Iona Sara McDonald - to be Lord-Lieutenant of Ayrshire and Arran. – 26 October 2017
The Rt. Hon. The Lady Haughey,  - to be Lord-Lieutenant of Lanarkshire – 26 October 2017

Life Peer

Conservative Party
Dr. Ian Duncan, to be Baron Duncan of Springback, of Springbank in the County of Perth – 14 July 2017
Sir Theodore Angnew,  to be Baron Agnew of Oulton, of Oulton in the County of Norfolk – 19 October 2017
 Rona Fairhead,  to be Baroness Fairhead, of Yarm in the County of North Yorkshire – 19 October 2017

Crossbench
The Rt Hon. Sir Ian Burnett, to be Baron Burnett of Maldon, of Maldon in the County of Essex – 30 October 2017
The Rt Hon. Sir Christopher Geidt,  to be Baron Geidt, of Crobeg in the County of Ross and Cromarty – 3 November 2017
The Rt Rev. & Rt Hon. Richard Chartres,  to be Baron Chartres, of Wilton in the County of Wiltshire – 10 November 2017
Sir Bernard Hogan-Howe,  to be Baron Hogan-Howe, of Sheffield in the County of South Yorkshire – 10 November 2017
General Sir Nicholas Houghton,  to be Baron Houghton of Richmond, of Richmond in the County of North Yorkshire – 20 November 2017

Most Noble Order of the Garter

Stranger Knight Companion of the Order of the Garter (KG)
 His Majesty The King of Spain,  – 12 July 2017

Knight Bachelor 

 The Hon. Mr Justice Marcus Alexander Smith,  – 30 January 2017
 The Rt Hon. Mike Penning,  – 12 October 2017
 Robert Syms,  – 12 October 2017
 The Hon. Mr Justice Simon James Bryan,  – 25 October 2017
 The Hon. Mr Justice Akhlaq Ur-Rahman Choudhury,  – 25 October 2017 
 The Hon. Mr Justice Jonathan Lionel Cohen,  – 25 October 2017 
 The Hon. Mr Justice Julian Nicholas Goose,  – 25 October 2017 
 The Hon. Mr Justice Julian Bernard Knowles,  – 25 October 2017 
 The Hon. Mr Justice Peter Richard Lane,  – 25 October 2017 
 The Hon. Mr Justice Matthew James Nicklin,  – 25 October 2017 
 The Hon. Mr Justice Martin Benedict Spencer,  – 25 October 2017 
 The Hon. Mr Justice David Basil Williams,  – 25 October 2017 
 The Hon. Mr Justice Antony James Zacaroli,  – 27 November 2017

Most Distinguished Order of St Michael and St George

Knight Grand Cross of the Order of St Michael and St George (GCMG) 
 His Excellency The Hon. Robert Dadae – Governor-General of Papua New Guinea – 5 May 2017

Royal Victorian Order

Knight Grand Cross of the Royal Victorian Order (GCVO) 
 The Rt. Hon. Sir Christopher Geidt,  – Upon relinquishing his appointment as Private Secretary to Her Majesty and Keeper of The Queen's Archives – 5 October 2017
 His Royal Highness The Duke of Edinburgh,  – To celebrate the 70th Anniversary of his marriage to The Queen – 20 November 2017

Knight / Dame Commander of the Royal Victorian Order (KCVO / DCVO) 
 Rachel Ann Wells,  – on her retirement as Assistant Secretary of the Central Chancery of the Orders of Knighthood. - 28 July 2017
 Jonathan Marsden,  – upon relinquishing his appointment as Director of the Royal Collection and Surveyor of The Queen's Works of Art. - 19 December 2017

Commander of the Royal Victorian Order (CVO) 
 Dr. Simon Case - 7 July 2017 - formerly Principal Private Secretary to the Prime Minister.

Honorary
 Professor Leon Krier - 7 February 2017

Lieutenant of the Royal Victorian Order (LVO) 
 Raymond Wheaton,  - on retirement as Page of the Chambers, Royal Household. – 17 January 2017
 Shelley Chambers,  - for service as Deputy Head of Audit Services to the Royal Household. – 29 November 2017
 Ian Cornish – on his retirement as Head of Audit Services, Royal Household. – 12 December 2017

Member of the Royal Victorian Order (MVO) 
 Captain (QGO) Ganeshkumar Tamanf, The Queen’s Own Gurkha Logistic Regiment – on relinquishment of his appointment as Queen’s Gurkha Orderly Officer - 12 May 2017
 Captain (QGO) Lakitbahadur Gurung, The Royal Gurkha Rifles – on relinquishment of his appointment as Queen’s Gurkha Orderly Officer - 12 May 2017
 Wing Commander Samuel Peter Fletcher, Royal Air Force – on relinquishment of his appointment as Equerry to The Queen. – 25 August 2017

Most Excellent Order of the British Empire

Knight / Dame Commander of the Order of the British Empire (KBE / DBE) 

 The Hon. Mrs Justice Gwynneth Frances Knowles,  - 25 October 2017
 The Hon. Mrs Justice Jane Clare Moulder,  - 25 October 2017
 The Hon. Mrs Justice Amanda Louise Yip,  - 25 October 2017

Honorary
 Pauline Philip - For services to the NHS.
 Edna O'Brien - For services to literature.
 Ralph Lauren - For services to fashion.
 Paul Polman - For services to business.

Commander of the Order of the British Empire (CBE) 
Military division
 Air Commodore Martin Elliot Sampson,  – 21 April 2017

Honorary
 Reid Hoffman - For services to promoting UK business and social networking and the Marshall Scholarship scheme.
 Pertti Salolainen - For services to UK-Finland relations.

Officer of the Order of the British Empire (OBE) 
Military division
 Commander Stephen Higham, Royal Navy
 Commander Mark Richard Vartan, Royal Navy
 Colonel Angus Donald MacGillivray, 
 Colonel James Rowland Martin, The Princess of Wales’s Royal Regiment
 Colonel Geoffrey Edward Minton, The Princess of Wales’s Royal Regiment
 Squadron Leader Emily Elizabeth Rickards, Royal Air Force

Honorary
 Professor Christian de Boissieu - For services to UK-French relations.
 Professor Adrienne Margaret Flanagan - For services to cancer research.
 Benoit Marie Jacques Mottrie - For services to commemoration and remembrance of British and Commonwealth armed forces.
 Ambassador Jesus Paraiso Tambunting - For services to UK-Philippine trade relations.

Member of the Order of the British Empire (MBE) 
Military division
 Petty Officer Bethany Victoria Rauccio Burton, Royal Navy – 21 April 2017
 Major George John Robertson Little, Royal Marines – 21 April 2017
 Major Lloyd Benjamin Pritchard, Royal Marines – 21 April 2017
 Acting Major Thomas Joseph Goodall, The Royal Logistic Corps – 21 April 2017
 Lieutenant Colonel David Osborne Lee, The Parachute Regiment – 21 April 2017
 Colour Sergeant William Richard Thomas, The Parachute Regiment – 21 April 2017

Honorary
 Zainab Lababidi - For services to Oxfam.
 Angela Francisco Morado - For services to the British community in Portugal.
 Nuttanee Ratanapat - For services to UK interests in Thailand.
 Professor José Antonio de Sousa Neto - For services to UK interests and bilateral relations in business, culture, education and sport in the State of Minas Gerais, Brazil.
 Lars-Erik Wiklund - For services to UK-Sweden relations.
 Shereen Williams - For services to community service in Wales.

British Empire Medal (BEM) 

Honorary
 Mrs Thong-Udom Kerdphiami - For services to the British Embassy, Bangkok.
 Luiz Gustavo Miranda Lage - For services to British interests at the Rio 2016 Olympic and Paralympic Games.
 Maria Clara Mariani - For services to UK-Brazil historical patrimony and the British community in Bahia.
 Michael Joseph O’Halloran - For services to the Royal Academy.
 Professor Jaime Arturo Ramirez - For services to British interests at the Rio 2016 Olympic and Paralympic Games.
 George Stanley Tomkins - For services to the community in Kilkeel, Northern Ireland.

Distinguished Service Order

Companion of the Distinguished Service Order (DSO) 
 Wing Commander James Robert Edward Walls, Royal Air Force – 21 April 2017

Military Cross (MC) 

 Corporal Nicholas Jezeph, Royal Marines – 21 April 2017

Distinguished Flying Cross (DFC) 

 Squadron Leader Roger Alexander Cruickshank, Royal Air Force – 21 April 2017

Queen's Gallantry Medal (QGM) 

 Captain Giles Edward George Moon, The Royal Lancers – 21 April 2017
 Acting Corporal Samuel James Butler, Royal Army Medical Corps

Royal Victorian Medal (RVM) 

Gold
 Brian Alan Ernest Stanley,  - on relinquishment of the appointment of Stud Groom of the Royal Paddocks, Hampton Court. – 16 July 2017

Silver
 Alan Graham – 12 December 2017

Mentioned in Despatches 

 Major Daniel Thomas Eaton, Royal Marines – 21 April 2017
 Private Dominic Kyle Hopkins, The Parachute Regiment – 21 April 2017
 Colour Sergeant Steven David Nixon, The Parachute Regiment – 21 April 2017
 Flight Lieutenant Niall Pairman, Royal Air Force – 21 April 2017
 Flight Lieutenant Alex Fraser Vaughan, Royal Air Force – 21 April 2017

Queen’s Commendation for Bravery 
 Marine Mark Andrew Charles Wheeler, Royal Marines – 21 April 2017
 Sergeant Paul Thomas Byrne, The Parachute Regiment – 21 April 2017
 Lance Corporal Thomas Christopher Corrigan, Corps of Royal Electrical and Mechanical Engineers – 21 April 2017
 Corporal Antony Luke Collins, Royal Air Force – 21 April 2017

Queen's Commendation for Valuable Service 

 Acting Warrant Officer 2 Philip Barlow, Royal Marines – 21 April 2017
 Corporal Adam Paul Carter, Royal Marines – 21 April 2017
 Major James Dutton, Royal Marines – 21 April 2017
 Able Seaman (Seaman Specialist) Sarah Kirstie Griffiths, Royal Navy – 21 April 2017
 Commander Richard Hutchings, Royal Navy – 21 April 2017
 Petty Officer Craig Tyrone Jacobs, Royal Navy – 21 April 2017
 Corporal Edward Frank Main, Royal Marines – 21 April 2017
 Major James Edward Dallas Morris, Royal Marines – 21 April 2017
 Chief Petty Officer Peter Daniel Muir, Royal Navy – 21 April 2017
 Corporal Jamie Christopher Calvert, The Parachute Regiment – 21 April 2017
 Corporal Mahesh Gurung, The Royal Gurkha Rifles – 21 April 2017
 Major Edward Louis Tabor Harris, Corps of Royal Engineers – 21 April 2017
 Colonel Robert Mackenzie Howieson – 21 April 2017
 Major Edwin Peter Ooldild, The Royal Gurkha Rifles – 21 April 2017
 Major Colin Malcolm Oliver, The Rifles – 21 April 2017
 Sapper Philippa Proud, Corps of Royal Engineers, Army Reserve – 21 April 2017
 Staff Sergeant Christopher Arthur Rhodes, Royal Corps of Signals – 21 April 2017
 Acting Brigadier James Christopher Roddis,  – 21 April 2017
 Major David Joseph Stead, Corps of Royal Engineers – 21 April 2017
 Flight Lieutenant Alex Joseph Douglas Bamber, Royal Air Force – 21 April 2017
 Flight Lieutenant George Le Cornu, Royal Air Force – 21 April 2017
 Squadron Leader Christopher Michael Pearson, Royal Air Force – 21 April 2017
 Miss Lisa Michelle Wain, Civil Servant – 21 April 2017

Order of St John

Baliff / Dame Grand Cross of the Order of St John 

 The Hon. Lady Mary Angela Fiona Barttelot, 
 The Most Rev. Archbishop Emeritius Desmond Tutu,

Knight of the Order of St John 

 The Rt. Rev. John Davies
 Assistant Commissioner Colin Jones, 
 The Rt. Rev. Barry Cennydd Morgan
 Jeremy Gilbert Oakley Stubbs
 Dr. Chung Chin Hung

Dame of the Order of St John 

 Dame Mary Peters,

Commander of the Order of St John 

 Peter Watts Baker
 Peter Richard Bradley, 
 Kwok-hoo Pedro Ching
 Major Martin James Everett, 
 David Charles Joliffe
 Adam Keith Johnston
 David Christopher Lindsay
 Andrew David Mitchell
 Derek William Charles Morgan, 
 John Winston Reynolds
 Robert Frederick Sanderson
 John Edward Sunckell

References 

Special Honours
2017 awards in the United Kingdom
British honours system